

Civita is a Norwegian liberal think tank which gains support from, among others, the Confederation of Norwegian Enterprise. In the beginning, it was led by Terje Svabø, but prominent Conservative Party politician Kristin Clemet took over on November 16, 2006, after having central roles in many projects.

The organization works to promote the value of individualism and a free market economy. It functions as a network of people with different political affiliation from different sectors of society (academia, business, media, organizations and politics). The organization spreads its message through seminars, lectures, research, and book publications.

Leadership 
 Kristin Clemet – Managing Director
 David Hansen – Director
 Therese Thomassen – Communication Advisor
 İyad el-Baghdadi, fellow

See also 
 Stiftelsen Manifest
 LibLab

References

External links
 Official English web site

Libertarian think tanks
Libertarianism in Europe
Political and economic think tanks based in Europe
Think tanks based in Norway